Lake Denoon is the smallest of three lakes located in Muskego, Wisconsin.

References

Denoon